Arunagirinathar is a 1964 Indian Tamil-language devotional film, directed by T. R. Ramanna and written by Sakthi T. K. Krishnasamy. Based on the poet of the same name, the film stars T. M. Soundararajan, supported by M. R. Radha, B. S. Saroja, Sharatha, C. Lakshmi Rajyam and Master Raghunath. It was released on 7 August 1964.

Plot 

Arunagirinathar was born in the town of Tiruvannamalai in Tamil Nadu. Arunagiri is portrayed as attracted to the pleasures of the flesh and spent his youth pursuing a life of debauchery. He frequently visited the devadasi Maragatham. His sister, Aadhilakshmi, wants to reform her brother, so she arranges his marriage with Gnanavalli. However, he is unhappy with his life, neglects his wife and continues his bad ways. He persuades his sister to sell all their property and their house to get money for his dissipation. Despite his sister giving him the money she earns, he reduces himself, his wife, and his sister to dire poverty. He contracts leprosy, and people avoid him.

Eventually Aadhilakshmi is unable to meet his demands for money to support his depraved life. Arunagiri says he will end his life because of this. To prevent Arunagiri from killing himself, his sister says that he should sell her in order to have money for prostitutes. However, as Arunagiri has leprosy, prostitutes avoid him. Aadhilakshmi offers herself to him in order to stop Arunagiri from committing suicide. This deeply shocks Arunagiri, and he realises the consequences his actions have had on his family. Arunagiri feels guilty and attempts suicide by jumping off a temple tower, but Murugan himself, disguised as a pious young man, saves him. Murugan cures his leprosy, shows him a path of religious devotion, and initiates his composition of the Thiruppugal, an anthology of songs dedicated to Murugan.

Cast 
 T. M. Soundararajan as Arunagirinathar
 Master Sridhar as young Arunagirinathar
 Sharadha as Gnanavalli
 B. S. Saroja as Aadhilakshmi
 M. R. Radha as Samanthandam
 C. Lakshmi Rajyam as Maragatham
 R. Manohar as Tamil Pandit
 C. R. Parthiban as Vedan Lord Murugan (@Viralimalai)
 Master Raghunath as Lord Murugan
 Angamuthu as Maragatham's mother
 N. S. Kolappan as Annamalai

Production 
Arunagirinathar is based on the life of the poet of the same name who created Thirupugazh. This is the third film to be produced on this theme. B. S. Moorthy produced the film for Baba Art Productions. The script was written by Sakthi T. K. Krishnasamy.

Soundtrack 
The music was composed by G. Ramanathan and T. R. Pappa. The lyrics were by T. K. Krishnasamy. During production, Pappa completed the score after Ramanathan fell ill. The tune "Muthai Tharu" was composed by Pappa; before the recording, he called the religious preacher Kirupanandha Variyar, who explained its meaning. T. M. Soundararajan rehearsed for an entire day before he recorded it. The song is based on Shanmukhapriya raga.

Release and reception 
Arunagirinathar was released on 7 August 1964. The film was distributed by Sarathy Pictures in Madras. The Indian Express positively reviewed it for Soundararajan's performance and the music.

References

External links 
 

1960s biographical films
1960s Tamil-language films
1964 films
1964 musical films
Films about Hinduism
Films directed by T. R. Ramanna
Films scored by T. R. Pappa
Films scored by G. Ramanathan
Hindu devotional films
Indian biographical films
Indian black-and-white films
Indian epic films
Indian films based on actual events
Indian musical films
Religious epic films